Animerica was a monthly magazine published by Viz Media containing news, feature articles, and reviews on manga, anime, and related media, as well as a section that serialized manga published by Viz. After an initial  November 1992 preview issue, Animerica'''s first regular issue was released in February 1993 with a March 1993 cover date. In 1998, Animerica Extra was launched as a separate manga anthology magazine which eventually focused specifically on shōjo titles. It was canceled in 2004.

Viz changed the magazine's format in April 2005, with the new magazine being three different free publications of the same name. One is advertising-oriented and created specially for distribution at anime and manga conventions while the other is more general in scope and with a version each for distribution through Waldenbooks and Borders stores. A similar version was later added for Best Buy stores. All three versions have fewer and briefer articles and a lower page count.Animerica was one of the first top professional anime and manga magazines released in the United States, and one of the most popular in the 1990s. In 2004, it had a circulation of 45,000 readers, but low sales and high competition from Newtype USA resulted in the essential cancellation of the original magazine and its reformatting as a free digest. 100 copies of the first issue of the free digest were sent to 1,000 Waldenbooks and Border stores.

HistoryAnimerica was introduced in 1992 with the release of a very low print issue 0, a preview issue, in November 1992, with the first official issue following in March 1993. With Viz's connections to Shogakukan, the magazine was one of the first professional-quality anime and manga oriented magazine to be released in the United States. At the magazine's launch, it was co-edited by Seiji Horibuchi, Satoru Fujii, and Trish Ledoux. In 1998, Viz introduced a related magazine, Animerica Extra, which was its first monthly manga anthology. This secondary magazine was canceled in 2004. To celebrate the magazine's ninth anniversary, Viz launched a redesign of the magazine starting with the November 2001 issue  that included a new cover design, a new logo, and an increased focus on news, reviews, and Japanese trends. Fold-out posters were also added to every issue. During 2002 the magazine was published in a square bound, full colour format without a manga serial that had previously been included. By 2003, the magazine had also doubled its initial page count.

When Viz began publication of Animerica, it registered the name as a trademark. In 1997, a Japanese company named Redsun began using the domain name "animerica.com" to host an adult oriented and hentai distribution website. Viz attempted to purchase the domain name from the company, but Redsun refused. Viz filed a lawsuit claiming the website infringed on its trademark. The court agreed that the website was causing confusion with Viz's publication, but that the confusion was primarily limited to American audiences. The court refused Viz's request that the site be shut down and its assets frozen. It did, however, require that Redsun put a disclaimer on its website and all advertising noting that it was not affiliated with the Animerica magazine nor with Viz Media and that it provide a link to Viz's existing official website for the magazine at "www.animerica-mag.com." In November 2004, Redsun's adult website closed. Viz claimed the name in 2005, and by October the site had been relaunched as the official website of the new Animerica magazine.

Reformatted
In April 2005, Viz announced that the magazine would be reformatted into two different free versions, and the monthly subscription version would be discontinued. The first version, similar to the original but with a lower page count, is advertising-sponsored and produced exclusively for specific anime and manga conventions and made available at those conventions for free. The second version is a quarterly digest-sized magazine that focuses more on content and has a wider range of content versus the convention version. Termed "magalogs" by Viz, these digest versions are distributed freely at Borders and Waldenbooks. A third variety, specifically for Best Buy stores was later added to the line up.

The last monthly issue of the original Animerica was released with a cover date of June 2005 (Volume 13, No. 6). Subscriptions to the original magazine were replaced with subscriptions to Viz's Shojo Beat manga anthology which was launched in July 2005.

Features
Each issue of the original Animerica included articles covering anime and manga releases in both the United States and Japan, interviews with industry professionals such as voice actors and directors, reviews of anime and manga series, and articles and reviews on related areas such as games, model kits, and music releases. They would also include a single chapter from a current Viz manga series. Over the course of the magazine's history, chapters from Area 88, Galaxy Express 999, One-Pound Gospel, and Urusei Yatsura appeared in it.

Final issues of the magazine still included articles on anime and manga releases, reviews of titles, and manga previews, but they were all shorter and more concise than the original. The new version had a much lower page count, leaving fewer articles in each issue.

Circulation and receptionAnimerica was one of the most popular anime and manga magazines in North America for nearly a decade. In July 2000, Animerica was named the Best English-language publication at the Society for the Promotion of Japanese Animation awards at Anime Expo. In 2004, the magazine had a circulation of 45,000, with 80% of its issues bought via newsstands rather than by subscription. This number was a drop from previous years, due to greater competition from other magazines, resulting in Viz's changing its format. Approximately 100 copies of the first issue of the free version of Animerica'' were sent to 1,000 Borders and Waldenbooks stores around the United States.

See also 
 List of manga magazines published outside of Japan

References

Further reading

External links
 

Anime and manga magazines
Defunct magazines published in the United States
Digests
Magazines established in 1992
Magazines disestablished in 2005
Monthly magazines published in the United States
Magazines published in San Francisco